Rear Admiral John Scott Burhoe (born September 12, 1954) was the 39th Superintendent of the United States Coast Guard Academy in New London, Connecticut from 2007 to 2011. His previous position was Assistant Commandant for Governmental and Public Affairs at Coast Guard Headquarters in Washington, D.C. He earned his commission after graduating from Officer Candidate School in 1977.  He is the first non-Academy graduate to lead the school in at least one hundred years.

His first assignment out of OCS was to lead the USCG Ceremonial Honor Guard in Washington, D.C. In his 30 years of public service, he has served in a variety of operational and staff assignments including Executive Officer and Alternate Captain of the Port, Coast Guard Station New London, Connecticut, Commanding Officer, Station Fort Lauderdale, Florida, and Group Commander, Group Sandy Hook, New Jersey.

Burhoe's staff assignments have been focused primarily in the human resource specialty at Training Center Cape May, the USCG Academy with the Leadership Development Center, Training Center Yorktown, Virginia, Coast Guard Headquarters, and as the Chief of the Officer Personnel Management Division at the Coast Guard Personnel Command.

He graduated from Virginia Polytechnic Institute and State University (better known as Virginia Tech) with a Bachelor of Science degree in sociology, and later earned a Master of Public Administration degree from The American University in Washington, D.C.

He and his wife Betsy have two grown children, Aaron and Amy.

On June 3, 2011, Rear Admiral Burhoe retired from the U.S. Coast Guard after 34 years service. RADM Burhoe became the 10th President of Fork Union on July 18, 2011, assuming command from Lieutenant General John E. Jackson, United States Air Force (Ret.), who retired on July 1, 2011, after 17 years as the 9th President of Fork Union Military Academy of Fork Union, Virginia. RADM Burhoe retired as Superintendent of FUMA on July 1, 2018.

Rear Admiral Burhoe resided in Careby Hall, an 1895 Victorian house which was the home of the school's founder, Dr. William Hatcher.

Awards and honors

References

External links

 US Coast Guard Academy official biography

United States Coast Guard admirals
Recipients of the Legion of Merit
American University School of Public Affairs alumni
Living people
1954 births
Recipients of the Meritorious Service Medal (United States)